Paul Joseph Sheehy (November 1, 1934 – March 10, 2014) was an American politician who served in the Massachusetts House of Representatives, Massachusetts Senate and was City Manager of Lowell, Massachusetts.

Sheehy was born in Lowell. He attended Keith Academy, Lowell State College, and Suffolk University Law School.

From 1965 to 1972 he was a member of the Massachusetts House of Representatives. In 1972 he ran for the Massachusetts's 5th congressional district seat vacated by F. Bradford Morse. He finished second in the nine candidate Democratic primary, losing to John Kerry 27.56% to 20.75%. From 1971 to 1973 he served as director of the Lowell Bank and Trust Co.

In 1974, Sheehy was named city manager of Lowell. He resigned his post on September 5, 1975, after he was convicted of bank fraud and three counts of making false statements in Lowell Bank and Trust Co.'s books. He was sentenced to 60 days in prison and lost his license to practice law.

During the late 1970s and early 1980s, Sheehy worked in the offices of Congressmen James M. Shannon and Joseph D. Early.

In 1984 he was elected to the Massachusetts Senate. He served three terms before losing to Republican Nancy A. Sullivan in 1990.

Sheehy died on March 10, 2014.

References

1934 births
2014 deaths
Massachusetts lawyers
City managers of Lowell, Massachusetts
Disbarred American lawyers
University of Massachusetts Lowell alumni
Democratic Party Massachusetts state senators
Democratic Party members of the Massachusetts House of Representatives
Suffolk University Law School alumni
People convicted of making false statements
American people convicted of fraud
20th-century American lawyers